Baidit is a  Payam in Bor West County, in Jonglei State, South Sudan.  It is situated on the east side of the  Bahr al Jabal River a short distance north of Bor, South Sudan.  Baidit is the county headquarters for Bor West County.

Baidit Massacre
around 4:00 P.M. on Sunday, 23rd January 2022, at Baidit Payam, Bor County. Jonglei State, a group of organized gangs of criminals, heavily armed, suspected to be from neighboring Pibor Administrative Area, launched an attack in the area, killed and wounded innocent civilians, set homes on fire raided cattle, and marched Eastward.
The State government and Jonglei Communities according to the letter, were and still are appalled by this shocking news this atrocious attack led to 32 innocent lives taken, 24 people wounded. 1 missing, 2,600 cattle raided, and a number of immovable properties destroyed or burnt.

History
Baidit  Payam is named for the village, Baidit (whose name is sometimes combined with an adjoining town, called Padak), where the  payam's administrative headquarters are located.  During the  Second Sudanese Civil War (1983–2004), Baidit village was the site of a Sudan People's Liberation Army headquarters commanded by Kuol Manyang Juuk, which was located in buildings originally constructed by the Dutch Government to house a medical training center.

Demographics
Baidit is composed of six bomas:  Akayiech,  Manydeng,   Makol Cuei,  Mathiang,  Mayen, and Tong.  According to the Fifth Population and Housing Census of Sudan, conducted in April 2008, Baidit had a combined population of 51,532 people, composed of 26,915 male and 24,617 female residents.

Baidit is home to three major communities.  These are Angakuei, Biong, Pathuyith.

Infrastructure
The Padak/Baidit airstrip is located in Baidit  Payam.   John Garang Memorial University's Padak Fisheries Training Centre was established there in 2004.

Notes

References 

Geography of South Sudan
Jonglei State
Subdivisions of South Sudan